Groningen (or ) is the capital city and main municipality of Groningen province in the Netherlands. The capital of the north, Groningen is the largest place as well as the economic and cultural centre of the northern part of the country; as of December 2021, it had 235,287 inhabitants, making it the sixth largest city/municipality of the Netherlands and the second largest outside the Randstad.

Groningen was established more than 950 years ago and gained city rights in 1245. Due to its relatively isolated location from the then successive Dutch centres of power (Utrecht, The Hague, Brussels), Groningen was historically reliant on itself and nearby regions. As a Hanseatic city, it was part of the North German trade network, but later it mainly became a regional market centre. At the height of its power in the 15th century, Groningen could be considered an independent city-state and it remained autonomous until the French era.

Today Groningen is a university city, home to some of the country's leading higher education institutes; University of Groningen (Rijksuniversiteit Groningen), which is the Netherlands's second oldest university, and Hanze University of Applied Sciences (Hanzehogeschool Groningen). Students comprise an estimated 25% of its total population and makes it the country's demographically youngest city.

Etymology
The origin and meaning of 'Groningen' and its older variant, 'Groeningen', are uncertain.

One modern theory is that 'Groningen' meant 'among the people of Groni' ('Groningi' and 'Groninga' in the 11th century), derived from Gronesbeke, which was the old name for a small lake near the Hunze (on the northern border of Zuidlaarderveen). Another theory is that the name was derived from the word groenighe, meaning 'green fields'.

During the French occupation of the area, Groningen was called Groningue. In Frisian, it is called Grins. In Groningen province, it is called . Regionally, it is often simply referred to as Stad (the "city"), and its inhabitants are referred to as Stadjers or Stadjeder. The Dutch sometimes refer to it as "the Metropolis of the North", or Martinistad (after the Martinitoren tower.)

History

The city was founded at the northernmost point of the Hondsrug area. While the oldest document referring to Groningen's existence dates from 1040, the area was occupied by Anglo-Saxons centuries prior. The oldest archaeological evidence of a settlement in the region stems from around 3950–3650 BC, and the first major settlement in Groningen trace back to the year 3 AD.

In the 13th century Groningen was an important trade centre and its inhabitants built a city wall to underline its authority. The city had a strong influence on its surrounding lands and the Gronings dialect became a common tongue. The most influential period of the city was at the end of the 15th century, when the nearby province of Friesland was administered from Groningen. During these years the Martinitoren was built which is considered to be the city's most significant landmark.

In 1536, Groningen accepted Emperor Charles V, the King of Spain and the Habsburg ruler of the other Netherlands as its ruler, thus ending the region's autonomy. The city was captured in the Siege of Groningen (1594) by the Dutch and English forces led by Maurice of Nassau. After the siege, the city and the province joined the Dutch Republic.

The University of Groningen was founded in 1614 with initial course offerings in law, medicine, theology and philosophy. During the same period the city expanded rapidly and a new city wall was built. 

The Siege of Groningen (1672) led by the bishop of Münster, Bernhard von Galen during the Third Anglo-Dutch War failed and the city walls resisted; an event that is celebrated annually with music and fireworks on 28 August as "Gronings Ontzet" or "Bommen Berend".

During World War II, the main square and the Grote Markt were largely destroyed in the Battle of Groningen in April 1945. However, the church Martinitoren, the Goudkantoor, and the city hall were undamaged.

Geography

Canals
Numerous canals (grachten) surround the city, locally called diep. The major canals that travel from the city are the Van Starkenborghkanaal, Eemskanaal, and Winschoterdiep.

Climate
Groningen has an oceanic temperate climate, like all of the Netherlands, although slightly colder in winter than other major cities in the Netherlands due to its northeasterly position. Weather is influenced by the North Sea to the north-west and its prevailing north-western winds and gales.

Summers are somewhat warm and humid. Very rainy periods are common, especially in spring and summer. Annual sunshine hours vary, but are usually below 1600 hours, giving much cloud cover similar to most of the Netherlands. Climate in this area has mild differences between highs and lows, and there is adequate rainfall year-round. The Köppen Climate Classification subtype for this climate is "Cfb". (Marine West Coast Climate/Oceanic climate).

Winters are cool; on average above freezing, although frosts are common during spells of easterly winds. Snow often falls, but rarely stays long due to warmer daytime temperatures, although white snowy days happen every winter.

Economy
Hotel and catering industries constitute a significant part of the economy in Groningen. Focus on business services has increased over time and areas such as IT, life sciences, tourism, energy, and environment have developed.

Until 2008 there were two major sugar refineries within the city. The Suiker Unie plant was constructed in the outskirts of Groningen, but became a part of the city due to expansion. The factory had 98 employees before it was shutdown in 2008 due to a reduction in demand. As of 2017, CSM Vierverlaten in Hoogkerk remains the only beet sugar production plant in the city. Other notable companies from Groningen include publishing company Noordhoff Uitgevers, tobacco company Niemeyer, health insurance company Menzis, distillery Hooghoudt, and natural gas companies GasUnie and GasTerra.

Demographics

Immigration

Religion
The majority of people in Groningen, slightly more than 70%, are non-religious. With 25.1%, the largest religion in Groningen is Christianity.

Population growth

The municipality of Groningen has grown rapidly. In 1968 it expanded by mergers with Hoogkerk and Noorddijk, and in 2019 it merged with Haren and Ten Boer.
All historical data are for the original city limits, excluding Hoogkerk, Noorddijk, Haren and Ten Boer.

Its population density is 1,367 residents per km2 (3,540 per square mile). On 1 January 2019, it was merged with the municipalities of Ten Boer and Haren. The Groningen-Assen metropolitan area has about half a million inhabitants.

Culture
Groningen is nationally known as the "Metropolis of the North". The city is regarded as the main urban centre of the Northern part of the country, particularly in the fields of education, business, music and other arts. It is also known as "Martinistad", referring to the tower of the Martinitoren, which is named after Groningen's patron saint Martin of Tours. The large number its student population also contribute to a diverse cultural scene for a city of its size.

Since 2016 Groningen has been host of the International Cycling Film Festival—an annual film festival for bicycle related films. It takes place in the art house cinema of the old Roman Catholic Hospital.

The first major international chess tournament after World War II was held in Groningen from 1946-08-13 to 1946-09-07. The tournament, won by Mikhail Botvinnik of the USSR, was the first time the Soviet Union had sent a team of players to a foreign event. A major international chess festival and tournament ‘'Schaakfestival Groningen tournament'’ has been held in the city in most years, since 1946.

Museums

Groningen is home to the Groninger Museum. Its new building designed by Alessandro Mendini in 1994 echoes the Italian post-modern concepts and is notable for its futuristic and colourful style. The city has a maritime museum, a university museum, a comics museum and a graphics museum. Groningen is also the home of Noorderlicht, an international photographic platform that runs a photo gallery and organizes an international photo festival. The Forum Groningen that opened in 2019 is a cultural center consisting of a museum, art cinema, library, bars, rooftop terrace and tourist information office.

Theatre and music

Groningen has a city theatre called the Stadsschouwburg, located on the Turfsingel, a theatre and concert venue called Martini Plaza, and a cultural venue on the Trompsingel, called the Oosterpoort. Vera is located on the Oosterstraat, the Grand Theatre on the Grote Markt, and Simplon on the Boterdiep. Several cafés feature live music, a few of which specialize in jazz music, including the Jazzcafe De Spieghel on the Peperstraat. Groningen is the host city for Eurosonic Noorderslag, an annual music showcase event for bands from Europe.

Nightlife
Groningen's nightlife depends largely on its student population. Its cultural scene is regarded as vibrant and remarkable for a city of its size. In particular, the Grote Markt, the Vismarkt, the Poelestraat and Peperstraat are crowded every night, and most bars do not close until five in the morning. From 2005 to 2007, Groningen was named "best city centre" of the Netherlands. Groningen has a red-light district, called Nieuwstad.

Sports

 
FC Groningen, founded in 1971, is the local football club, and as of 2000 they play in the Eredivisie, the highest football league of the Netherlands. Winners of the KNVB Cup in the 2014–15 season, their best Eredivisie result was in the 1990–91 season when they finished third. Their current stadium which opened in January 2006 has 22,525 seats. It is called the Hitachi Capital Mobility Stadion; it was known as the "Euroborg stadium" before 2016, and "Noordlease Stadion" from 2016 to 2018.

American sports are fairly popular in Groningen; it has American football, baseball, and basketball clubs. Groningen's professional basketball club Donar play in the highest professional league, the Dutch Basketball League, and have won the national championship seven times. The Groningen Giants are the American football team of the city who play in the premier league of the AFBN and are nicknamed as the "Kings of the North".

The running event called 4 Miles of Groningen takes place in the city on the second Sunday of October every year with over 23,000 participants. The 2002 Giro d'Italia began in Groningen, including the prologue and the start of the first stage. The city hosted the start and finish of the fifth stage of the 2013 Energiewacht Tour.

Education

As of 2020, around 25% of the 230,000 inhabitants in Groningen are students. The city has the highest density of students and the lowest mean age in the Netherlands.

The University of Groningen (in Dutch: Rijksuniversiteit Groningen), established in 1614 is the second oldest university in the Netherlands (after the University of Leiden). The university educated the country's first female student, Aletta Jacobs, the first Dutch national astronaut, Wubbo Ockels, the first president of the European Central Bank, Wim Duisenberg, and two Nobel laureates; Heike Kamerlingh Onnes (in Physics) and Ben Feringa (in Chemistry). The university has about 31,000 students—22% of which are international.

The Hanze University of Applied Sciences (in Dutch: Hanzehogeschool Groningen) was founded in 1986 and is more focused on the practical application of knowledge, offering bachelor and master courses in fields like Electrical and Electronic Engineering, Communication and Multimedia Design, and Renewable Energy. With around 8.1% international students, Hanze hosts more than 28,000 students and is one of the largest universities of applied sciences by enrollment in the Netherlands.

Politics
As of January 2019, the Groningen municipality council has 45 members. GroenLinks is the largest party on the council with 11 seats. The PvdA holds 6 seats. Both D66 and the Socialist Party have 5 seats. The VVD has 4 seats, while ChristenUnie and the Party for the Animals each have 3 seats. Christian Democratic Appeal, 100% Groningen and Stadspartij have 2 seats each; the 2 remaining seats are divided between Student en Stad and the right party Party for Freedom.

International relations

Groningen is twinned with the following cities:

Groningen also has a trilateral partnership with the nearby northern German cities of Bremen and Oldenburg.

Transport

Cycling and walking

Groningen is known as the "World Cycling City"; around 57% of its residents use a bicycle for regular commute within the city. In 2000, Groningen was chosen as the Fietsstad 2002, the top cycle-city in the Netherlands for 2002. Similar to most Dutch cities, Groningen is developed to accommodate a large number of cyclists. An extensive network of bike paths were planned to make it more convenient to cycle to various destinations instead of taking a car.

The city has segregated cycle-paths, public transport, and a large pedestrianised zone in the city centre. Groningen's city centre was remodeled into a "pedestrian priority zone" to promote walking and biking. This was achieved by applying the principle of filtered permeability—the network configuration favours active transportation and selectively "filters out" traveling in a car by reducing the number of streets that run through the centre. The streets that are discontinuous for cars connect to a network of pedestrian and bike paths which permeate the entire centre. In addition, these paths go through public squares and open spaces, increasing the aesthetic appeal of the trip and encouraging more participation. The logic of filtering a mode of transport is fully expressed in a comprehensive model for laying out neighbourhoods and districts—the fused grid.

Public transport

Trains

Groningen railway station (in Dutch: Hoofdstation) is the main railway station and has regular services to most of the major cities in the country. The city's remaining two railway stations are Europapark and Noord.

Groningen has six railway routes:
Groningen – Delfzijl
Groningen – Roodeschool / Eemshaven
Groningen – Leeuwarden
Groningen – Veendam
Groningen – Weener / Leer
Groningen – Meppel / Zwolle

On those six routes, ten lines stop at:
Groningen – Groningen North – Sauwerd – Bedum – Stedum – Loppersum – Appingedam – Delfzijl West – Delfzijl 
Groningen – Groningen North – Sauwerd – Winsum – Baflo – Warffum – Usquert – Uithuizen – Uithuizermeeden – Roodeschool – (Low Service) Eemshaven
Groningen – Zuidhorn – Grijpskerk – Buitenpost – De Westereen – Feanwâlden – Hurdegaryp – Leeuwarden Camminghaburen – Leewarden
Groningen – Buitenpost – Leewarden
Groningen – Groningen Europapark – Kropswolde – Martenshoek – Hoogezand-Sappemeer – Sappemeer oost – Zuidbroek – Veendam
Groningen – Groningen Europapark – Kropswolde – Martenshoek – Hoogezand-Sappemeer – Sappemeer oost – Zuidbroek – Scheemda – Winschoten – (Lower service) Bad Nieuweschans – Weener – (Due to a broken bridge, trains do not go on to Leer. Take a bus from Groningen or Weener) 
Groningen – Groningen Europapark – Haren – Assen – Beilen – Hoogeveen – Meppel – Zwolle
Groningen – Assen – Zwolle – Amersfoort Centraal – Utrecht Centraal – Gouda – Rotterdam Alexander – Rotterdam Centraal
Groningen – Assen – Zwolle – Lelystad Centrum – Almere Centrum – Amsterdam South – Schiphol – Leiden Centraal – Den Haag Centraal / The Hague Centraal

Buses

Groningen has bus lines and Q-Link—a network of buses similar to a tram/metro network.

City & Q-Link Lines:
1: Main Station – City Center – UMCG North – Station Groningen North – Zernike – P+R Reitdiep
2: Groningen Europapark – UMCG Main Entrance – UMCG North – Station Groningen North – Zernike – Station Zuidhorn
3: Lewenborg – P+R Kardingen – Main Station – P+R Hoogkerk – Leek
4: Beijum – P+R Kardingen – Main Station – P+R Hoogkerk – Peize – Roden
5: Harkstede – P+R Meerstad – UMCG Main Entrance – City Centre – Main Station – P+R Haren – Zuidlaren – Annen
6: P+R Haren – Main Station – UMCG Main Entrance – Ten Boer – Appingedam – Delfzijl
7: De Wijert – Main Station – Westerhaven – Vinkhuizen – Paddepoel – Station Groningen North
8: P+R Hoogkerk – Hoogkerk – Westerhaven – Main Station -Groningen Europapark – Corpus den Hoorn – Martini hospital – P+R Hoogkerk
9: Eelde – Paterswolde – Martini hospital – Corpus den Hoorn – De Wijert – Main Station – Westerhaven – Paddepoel – Station Groningen North or Zernike
10: Corpus den Hoorn – Martini hospital – Main Station – Korrewegwijk – Station Groningen North
12: Main Station – Groningen Europapark – Euvelgunne – Eemspoort – P+R Meerstad – P+R Kardingen
15: Main Station – Paddepoel – Zernike
18: P+R Hoogkerk – Vinkhuizen – Paddepoel – Zernike

Q-Liner Lines:
300: Groningen – P+R Westlaren (Zuidlaren) – P+R Gieten – P+R Borger – Emmen
304: Groningen – P+R Hoogkerk – Drachten
309: Groningen – Assen Busstation Marsdijk – Kloosterveen
312: Groningen – P+R Haren – P+R Annen – P+R Gieten – Gasselte – Stadskanaal
314: Groningen – Drachten
315: Groningen – Heereveen – Emmeloord

Night Lines:
402: Groningen → Corpus den Hoorn → Paterswolde → Eelde → Vries → Tynaarlo → Groningen
406: Groningen – Ten Boer – Appingedam – Delfzijl
417: Groningen → P+R Hoogkerk → Peize → Roden → Leek → P+R Hoogkerk – Groningen
418: Groningen → Haren → Zuidlaren → Annen → P+R Gieten → P+R Annen → P+R Westlaren → P+R Haren → Groningen 
419: Groningen – Assen Busstation Marsdijk – Station Assen

Regional lines:
35: Groningen – Aduard – Oldehove
39: Groningen – Vinkhuizen – Zuidhorn – Grootegast – Surhuisterveen
50: Groningen – Haren – Glimmen – Vries – Station Assen
51: Groningen – Haren – Zuidlaren – Annen – Loon – Station Assen
61: Groningen – Bedum – Middelstum – Uithuizen
65: Groningen – Winsum – Zoutkamp
76: Groningen – Hoogezand
85: Lewenborg – Groningen – Leek – Oosterwolde 
86: Groningen – Peize – Norg
88: P+R Hoogkerk – Oostwold – Leek
107: Zernike – P+R Gieten – Gasselte – Stadskanaal
109: Zernike – Tynaarlo – Assen Busstation Marsdijk
133: Groningen – P+R Hoogkerk – Via A7 – Grootegast – Surhuisterveen
139: Groningen – Hoogkerk – Grootegast – Surhuisterveen
160: Groningen – Eemshaven
163: Groningen – Winsum – Lauwersoog (connecting the ferry to Schiermonnikoog)
171: Zernike – Via A7 – Hoogezand – Veendam
174: Groningen – Hoogezand- Zuidbroek – Veendam
178: Groningen – Slochteren – Siddeburen – Appingedam (limited Service to Appingedam)
182: Zernike – Drachten
183: Zernike – Leek
184: Zernike – Roden
189: Groningen – Marum – Drachten
Other Lines:
563: Lewenborg – Thesinge – Sint Annen – Ten Boer
564: Ten Boer – Woltersum – Appingedam
637: Groningen → Zuidhorn → Grijpskerk → Zoutkamp
679: Zernike ← Winschoten

Direct bus routes from Groningen to Bremen, Hamburg, Berlin, and Munich are also available.

Motorways
The A28 motorway connects Groningen to Utrecht (via Assen, Zwolle and Amersfoort). The A7 motorway connects it to Friesland and Zaandam (West), and Winschoten and Leer (East).

Airport

Groningen Airport Eelde is an international airport located near Eelde, in Drenthe, with scheduled services to Guernsey, Gran Canaria, Antalya, Crete, Mallorca & Bodrum.

Notable people

Abel Janszoon Tasman (1603–1659), explorer, seafarer, merchant for the Dutch East India Company
Albert Dominicus Trip van Zoudtlandt (1776–1835), lieutenant-general at the Battle of Waterloo
Heike Kamerlingh Onnes (1853–1926), physicist, Nobel laureate
Dirk Jan de Geer (1870–1960), statesman and Dutch Prime Minister (1926–29, 1939–40), advocated peace settlement between the Netherlands and Nazi Germany in 1940
A. W. L. Tjarda van Starkenborgh Stachouwer (1888–1978), last colonial Governor-General of the Netherlands East Indies
Michel Velleman (1895–1943), Jewish magician
Jan Wolthuis (1903–1983), lawyer and collaborator, active in far-right politics after WWII
Esmée van Eeghen (1918–1944), Dutch resistance member executed by the Nazis in Paddepoel, Noorddijk
Pete Hoekstra (born 1953), United States ambassador to the Netherlands, former Republican member of Congress representing Michigan's 2nd congressional district
Gerard Kemkers (born 1967), speed skating bronze medalist at 1988 Winter Olympics
Bauke Mollema (born 1986), cyclist
Kim Feenstra (born 1985), model
Ben Woldring (born 1985), internet entrepreneur
Noisia (2000–present), music producers

See also
Sint Geertruidsgasthuis, a hofje in Groningen

References

Bibliography

External links

Official website 

 
Cities in the Netherlands
Members of the Hanseatic League
Municipalities of Groningen (province)
Populated places in Groningen (province)
Provincial capitals of the Netherlands